Federal Territory Day is a territorial public holiday observed annually on 1 February by the federal territories of Kuala Lumpur, Labuan and Putrajaya in Malaysia. The date marks the anniversary of the transfer of Kuala Lumpur from the state of Selangor to the federal government, which occurred on 1 February 1974.

History
The Federal Territory Day was introduced on 1 February 1974, four days after the Federal Territory Agreement was signed on 28 January 1974 by the Yang di-Pertuan Agong, Tuanku Abdul Halim Muadzam Shah of Kedah and the Sultan of Selangor, Almarhum Sultan Salahuddin Abdul Aziz Shah. On 16 April 1984, Labuan became the second federal territory, and on 1 February 2001, Putrajaya became the third federal territory of Malaysia.

In addition, 1 February also has significance as the day of the formation of the Federation of Malaya in 1948.

Main Theme and Venue

Merdeka Square, Kuala Lumpur

Federal Territory official awards and decorations
The Federal Territory official awards and decorations were introduced on 1 February 2008. The awards received by the Yang di-Pertuan Agong as the Head of State for the Federal Territories.

See also
 Ministry of Federal Territories

References

Federal Territories in Malaysia
February observances
Public holidays in Malaysia